Arthur Batanides (April 9, 1923 – January 10, 2000) was an American film and television actor, originally from Tacoma, Washington.

Biography and career
He became enamored with acting after performing stand-up routines in front of fellow GIs in Europe during World War II. He was educated in dramatic art at the Actors' Lab in Los Angeles, followed by extensive stage experience.

Batanides guest starred in such series as Crusader, Tombstone Territory, Zorro, Combat!, The Twilight Zone, The Asphalt Jungle, One Step Beyond, Blue Light, Lost in Space, Mission: Impossible, The Silent Force, I Spy, The Dick Van Dyke Show, The Wild Wild West, Alfred Hitchcock Presents, Bearcats!, The Odd Couple, The Andy Griffith Show, Bonanza, Columbo and Happy Days. He appeared as Bill Golding in the season six, 1963 episode of Perry Mason titled "The Case of the Shoplifter's Shoe". One of his more recognizable roles was that of the unfortunate Starfleet officer/geologist D'Amato in the Star Trek episode "That Which Survives". Among his film credits are The Unearthly (1957), Violent Road (1958), The Leech Woman (1960), Man-Trap (1961), The Maltese Bippy (1969), Evil Roy Slade (1972) and Brannigan (1975). He also appeared as Mr. Kirkland in four of the Police Academy film series, and the sixth installment (City Under Siege) was his final acting appearance.

Batanides died on January 10, 2000, in Los Angeles, California.

Filmography

Selected Television

References

External links

American male film actors
American male television actors
Male actors from Tacoma, Washington
20th-century American male actors
1922 births
2000 deaths
United States Army personnel of World War II